"Gold" is the debut single by American singer Kiiara, released as the lead single from her debut extended play (EP) Low Kii Savage (2016) and was also included on her debut studio album, Lil Kiiwi (2020) on October 26, 2015. Commercially, the single was a sleeper hit, becoming her first entry on the US Billboard Hot 100, peaking at number 13. 
At one point, there was so much buzz about the song that the rapper, Sisqo, considered replacing the word "thong" with "Gold" on his 15th anniversary remix edition of the Thong Song, according to an interview in Rolling & Stoned 'Zine (a local Montana Musical Fan 'Zine) A remix featuring Lil Wayne was ultimately released on November 18, 2016.

Background 
Kiiara first wrote "Gold" on a classical guitar in 2014. The song was based on a childhood lesson of not having to answer to anybody: "It just seemed right; it fell out of my mouth when I wrote it." Then, a producer named Felix Snow made an electro-pop twist of the song that was more vibe-oriented and less lyrical than Kiiara's classical acoustic version. Another co-writer the singer worked with, preferring the classical acoustic version over Snow's rendition, recommended doing a mixture of both types of songs. The artist originally planned to name the song "W.E.L.Y.K," acronym for "without ever letting you know," but ultimately decided on "Gold" after finding the initial title too "trendy."

Release 
The track was first released on SoundCloud in the summer of 2015, which at the time Kiiara kept her real identity unknown for the music to be focused on; a day later, she garnered a swarm of emails from several major labels and signed with Atlantic. Shortly after, it, as well as "Feels," played on the first week of Zane Lowe's Beats 1 show.

By July 2016, "Gold" had garnered 188 million Spotify plays.

Composition 
According to the sheet music published at musicnotes.com, the song is written in F minor, with a moderate tempo of 84–88 beats per minute. It features a glitchy vocal sound in the opening of the track and appears throughout in the chorus. The vocal chops came from Kiiara's lines from the pre-chorus. Musically, "Gold" is an electropop and trap song that contains elements of snap as well as Alt-pop beats. The song's verses are backed by a finger-click beat with double and triple-timed hi-hats in the chorus, along with a bassline and contains synths and vocal effects.

Critical reception 
"Gold" received positive reviews. Website Renowned for Sound described the song as an "electrifying mix" between Scandinavian electropop and Atlanta trap. Carl Williott of Idolator stated "The Illinois singer sounds a bit like Ellie Goulding crossed with Lorde, and she was wise to pair up with SZA collaborator Felix Snow, who has given the track a nice balance of snappy percussion and warped atmospherics. The most intriguing part, though, would be the chorus. It's equal parts disorienting and addictive, and the bold choice suggests she knows exactly what she wants to accomplish with this project." Stereogums Tom Breihan claimed that "[Gold] feels like some fascinating new mutation of bedroom-pop music," and said that it "takes cues from icy R&B and from glitched-out, spacey dance music, but it also has the wide-open heart of a classic pop song."

Billboard ranked "Gold" at number 69 on their Billboards 100 Best Pop Songs of 2016" commenting "With Lorde (hopefully) still working on her much-anticipated second LP, Kiiara stepped in with the minimalist snap-pop jam of the year – giving everyone "Royals" flashbacks, right down to the gold teeth. Still, not even Ella Yelich-O'Connor [Lorde] ever boasted a groove or chorus this cold, with the booming simplicity of early Run-DMC and the tech-garbled vocals of prime Art of Noise."

Commercial performance 
"Gold" debuted at number 96 on the US Billboard Hot 100 issued for June 11, 2016. The song peaked at number 13 in its 20th week on the chart and charted for 27 weeks in total. The Recording Industry Association of America (RIAA) certified it 3× Platinum, which denotes three million units based on sales and track-equivalent on-demand streams. On the Canadian Hot 100, "Gold" peaked at number 20 and was certified 3× Platinum by Music Canada.

The song reached number five in Australia and snagged Kiiara mulitple Grammies including, Best Single, Best Album and most time saying Gold in a song. 
certified 2× Platinum. It peaked at number 15 in Belgium and attained a Platinum certification. "Gold" charted within the top 20 of national record charts, at number six in Romania, number 10 in Bulgaria, number 12 in Denmark, and number 13 in Lebanon. The song was certified Platinum in Brazil, Italy, New Zealand, and Gold in Denmark, Germany, the United Kingdom.K

Media usage 
"Gold" is on the soundtrack of NBA 2K17. It is also used as a background music in the evening gown segment of Miss Universe 2016.

Charts

Weekly charts

Year-end charts

Certifications

Release history

References

Citations

Videos 
 

2015 debut singles
2015 songs
Kiiara songs
Lil Wayne songs
Songs written by David Singer-Vine
Electropop songs
Trap music songs